The Chíllar River is a river in the east of the Province of Málaga, Spain. It originates in the Sierra de Almijara and enters Mediterranean Sea just west of the town of Nerja.

Location

Most of the river runs through the Sierras of Tejeda, Almijara and Alhama Natural Park, which is always open to the public.
The rocks are 98.1% carbonate, 1.9% siliceous.
The river has eaten out the limestone of the Sierra de Almijara] to create a deep canyon.

In 1997 the municipality of Nerja launched a plan to stop the dumping of building rubble and garbage into the lower section of the river, and to make this section suitable for recreational use.

Walk

A walk up the river to the "Vado de Los Patos" (Duck's Ford) pool starts at the "los Almachares" asphalt road, which runs under the A-7 motorway to a concrete factory, turns to gravel and leads to the entrance to the park.
Further up the route leads along the bed of the river, which is normally just ankle deep, but may be up to a foot deep at times.

At  the "Vado de Los Patos" pool is fed by a small waterfall, and provides a place for swimming.
Above El Vado de los Patos the going is harder.
About  higher the river crosses La Presa (The Dam), which holds a reservoir that feeds irrigation channels that run along one side of the river valley.

Notes

Sources

Rivers of Andalusia
Rivers of Spain